Heliconia hirsuta is a species of flowering plant in the family Heliconiaceae. This plant is an erect herb up to 2 m tall, and it is native to Central America, South America, and the Caribbean, from Belize to Trinidad to Argentina.

Uses
Heliconia hirsuta is widely cultivated as an ornamental plant in hot regions with humid climates.

References

External links
 Heliconia hirsuta observations on iNaturalist

hirsuta
Flora of South America
Flora of Central America
Flora of Trinidad and Tobago
Flora of Jamaica
Flora of the Windward Islands
Garden plants
Plants described in 1782
Flora without expected TNC conservation status